Soda Springs High School is a public high school in Soda Springs, Idaho, United States.

Athletics 

Soda Springs 2A girls state cross country team won 14 straight Idaho state championships from 2006 to 2019.  The boys 2A cross country team was named a 2019 Fall Sports Academic Champion.

Notable alumni 
 David Archer - former NFL quarterback. Soda Springs' football field is named "Archer Field" in his honor.

References

Public high schools in Idaho
Schools in Caribou County, Idaho